Inferno is the fourth and final serial of the seventh season of the British science fiction television series Doctor Who, which was first broadcast in seven weekly parts on BBC1 from 9 May to 20 June 1970. The serial remains the last time a Doctor Who story was transmitted in seven episodes. This serial was also the last regular appearance of Caroline John in the role of Liz Shaw.

In the serial, the alien time traveller the Third Doctor (Jon Pertwee) transports himself "sideways in time" to a parallel world, where a British drilling project causes catastrophic amounts of heat and force to be unleashed when it penetrates the Earth's crust.

Plot
The Third Doctor and UNIT are called in to investigate a murder at Project Inferno, an effort to drill through the Earth's crust to harness great energies within the planet's core. It transpires that the drilling is producing a green ooze that transforms all who touch it into savage humanoid creatures called Primords, who can only be killed via extreme cold. Unbeknownst to anyone, the project leader, Professor Stahlman has been infected and is in the early stages of the change. After quarrelling with Stahlman, the Doctor attempts an experiment on the detached TARDIS console, but a freak accident transports him into a parallel space-time continuum.

In this new universe, where Great Britain is a fascist republic, the Doctor is captured and interrogated by Brigadier Lethbridge-Stewart's counterpart, a sadistic, eyepatch-wearing military commandant known as the Brigade Leader, along with the counterpart of the Doctor's companion Liz, who in this universe became a military officer instead of a scientist. When the drill penetrates the Earth's crust it unleashes immense amounts of heat and poisonous gases, along with more of the ooze, which Stahlman's counterpart uses to transform most of the remaining project staff into more Primords. The Doctor determines that the unleashed energies of the core will eventually disintegrate the planet, and is able to persuade the surviving staff members to help him return to his own dimension and prevent a similar catastrophe. They eventually succeed in restoring power to the TARDIS console despite repeated Primord attacks, but Liz's counterpart is forced to kill the Brigade Leader when he turns on the Doctor, who narrowly escapes as the Project Inferno facility is destroyed by a massive volcanic eruption.

Back in his own reality, the Doctor urgently tries to have the drilling stopped, but like in the other reality his warnings are ignored. This time, however, the slower pace of the drilling means that Stahlman fully transforms into a Primord before the crust is penetrated instead of afterwards, and after the Doctor kills him with a fire extinguisher, the drilling is stopped in time to prevent disaster. Satisfied that the TARDIS console is now working again, the Doctor attempts to depart, only to end up landing in a local rubbish dump.

Production

Scriptwriter Don Houghton was a personal friend of the Doctor Who script editor, Terrance Dicks: they had worked together for Lew Grade at ATV in the 1960s, on the TV soap opera Crossroads. During a train journey, Houghton discussed with Dicks his idea for a serial based on the real life drilling project known as Project Mohole. Budgetary limitations eventually led to the concept of the parallel world, so that the same actors and sets could be used for seven episodes, rather than the four episodes in Houghton's original story breakdown, in order to cut costs.

Despite Douglas Camfield receiving sole credit as director, the studio scenes for episodes 3 to 7 were directed by producer Barry Letts after Camfield had a minor heart attack on April 27, 1970. Letts later stated that Camfield's preparations were so meticulous, he merely followed Camfield's plans for Episodes 3 and 4, but the latter three episodes were largely his own work. Camfield remained credited as director, as BBC regulations at the time forbade Letts from being credited for more than one production role (i.e. as both producer and as director), but, more importantly, Letts did not want Camfield's illness to become widely known lest it harm his career.

Stuntman Derek Ware did not actually perform the stunt in which his character, the mutated RSF Trooper Wyatt, having been shot, falls to his death from the top of one of the chemical tanks, in case he was injured (since he was also needed for the subsequent studio recording). His place was taken by Roy Scammell, who (ironically) also played the soldier who fired the fatal shot. Ware stated in an interview that Scammell had already signed the contract to do the fall before Ware had been cast as Wyatt. At the time it was filmed, it was the highest fall ever performed by a British stuntman.

John Levene's portrayal of Benton as a Primord was inspired by Shakespeare's play Richard III (because of the Primord creature's hump).

Caroline John said she enjoyed her role as Section Leader Elizabeth Shaw, as it was fun playing Liz as a "baddie". She also said she hated doing the scenes in which she was playing her usual role, because it was boring compared to playing the parallel character. She was upset, though, about the scene in which Section-Leader Shaw shot Brigade Leader Lethbridge-Stewart, as she was pregnant at the time. As a result, the scene was recorded with the weapon fired from out-of-shot, after which Shaw was shown returning the gun to her holster. Her pregnancy made it impossible for her to continue in the show, and this became her final serial.

During the scenes set on the parallel Earth, images of the British Republic's leader are seen on posters. The image used is that of BBC visual effects designer Jack Kine, in homage to the 1954 BBC adaptation of Orwell's novel Nineteen Eighty-Four in which the face of Big Brother was actually that of the BBC's head of television design Roy Oxley (Kine had worked on the visual effects for that production).

Episode 6 has a small damaged section on the American NTSC videotape which was used as the source of the colour signal for the restoration, which the Doctor Who Restoration Team replaced by recolouring the appropriate section of the b/w film recording.

Locations
The exterior shots used in this production were filmed at Kingsnorth Industrial Estate in Medway, Kent which featured as the setting for the Inferno project.

Music
Director Douglas Camfield chose not to commission any new incidental music for the serial, but instead made use of existing library recordings by members of the BBC Radiophonic Workshop. These included: "Blue Veils & Golden Sands" and "The Delian Mode" (both by Delia Derbyshire); "Battle Theme", "Homeric Theme", "Attack of the Alien Minds" and "Souls in Space" (all by Brian Hodgson); and "Build Up To" (by David Vorhaus). In addition, as was usual, Brian Hodgson supplied new sound effects for the serial, including "Tardis Control On & Warp Transfer".

According to the DVD release notes from the ITV serial Timeslip, this music subsequently featured in the second episode of that show's serial The Time Of The Ice Box.

Cast notes
Christopher Benjamin, who plays Sir Keith Gold, subsequently appeared as Henry Gordon Jago in The Talons of Weng-Chiang (1977), and as Colonel Hugh Curbishley in "The Unicorn and the Wasp" (2008). He also played Tardelli in the audio play Grand Theft Cosmos. Most recently, he has returned to play the character of Henry Gordon Jago in a long-running series of audio dramas titled Jago & Litefoot based upon the situation established in The Talons of Weng-Chiang.

The role of Petra Williams was given to Sheila Dunn when Kate O'Mara was unavailable to play the part. O'Mara would, years later, be cast as the Rani, a renegade Time Lord. Dunn was the wife of this story's co-director, Douglas Camfield, and had appeared twice before in Doctor Who, in The Invasion (1968) and The Daleks' Master Plan (1965–66).

Ian Fairbairn had previously appeared as Questa in The Macra Terror (1967) and as Gregory in The Invasion, and would subsequently feature as Doctor Chester in The Seeds of Doom (1976).

Derek Newark (Greg Sutton) had previously played Za in the first ever Doctor Who serial, An Unearthly Child, in 1963.

Stuntman Alan Chuntz received a bad leg injury in episode 3 when he was hit by the car Jon Pertwee was driving. Pertwee felt so bad about it that he became ill himself, which threatened to disrupt filming.

Broadcast and reception

In 2009, Mark Braxton of Radio Times awarded the serial five stars out of five and praised the intense atmosphere, with a "good, scary, cautionary" plot. However, he noted that the Primords were not the best physical design and their relationship to the events was not cleared up. Reviewing the special edition DVD release, Dave Golder of SFX gave the serial four out of five stars. He wrote that the alternate universe plot that was (mistakenly cited as being) added to stretch out the story was "the best thing about it" and the actual plot felt "a little B-movie in comparison, but ... remains a stylish and action-packed slice of Pertwee Who". DVD Talk's Ian Jane rated Inferno three and a half out of five stars, praising the cast and "decent" production values. Jane noted that the story had a slow beginning, but once the pace picked up it became "choice entertainment". In 2008, The Daily Telegraph named Inferno as one of the ten best Doctor Who episodes ever. Charlie Jane Anders of io9 listed the cliffhanger of the sixth episode as one of Doctor Who greatest cliffhangers in a 2010 article. Den of Geek listed the serial as an example of good sound design and music score.

This serial was judged by a 2009 Doctor Who Magazine fan poll to be the finest story of the Third Doctor's era and 31st in the series overall (out of 200 stories total). A similar poll taken in 2014 ranked Inferno as the 18th-greatest story of all time.

Commercial releases

In print

A novelisation of this serial, written by Terrance Dicks, was published by Target Books in June 1984.

Home media
The original 625-line PAL videotapes were wiped for reuse in the mid 1970s. BBC Enterprises retained the black-and-white film recordings made for overseas sales. In 1985, a set of broadcast quality 525-line NTSC videotapes were returned from Canada. Due to the complexities of conversion, the original re-conversions back to 625-line PAL left the picture looking a little blurred and faded when the story was released on VHS in the UK in May 1994. Prior to this, episode 7 of the story had been included on the 1992 VHS release, The Pertwee Years (along with the final episodes of both The Dæmons and Frontier in Space).  When Inferno was released on Region 2 DVD on 19 June 2006, however, the picture quality had been markedly enhanced through the use of the "Reverse Standards Conversion" procedure. This serial was also released as part of the Doctor Who DVD Files in Issue 44 on 8 September 2010.

A special-edition re-release of the story was released on 27 May 2013. This uses the same technique employed on the special-edition DVD of The Claws of Axos: the colour information from the Reverse Standards Conversion video was combined with luminance information from a geometrically-corrected remaster of the b/w 16mm-film recording, with VidFIRE applied to the studio interior scenes to recreate the 50-field interlaced look. The resulting picture is sharper than the RSC version.

The Canadian videotapes include an additional scene in Episode 5 that was not originally transmitted in the UK, but was retained for overseas screening (and has also appeared on both the UK Gold transmissions and BBC Video's VHS release). Set in the Brigade Leader's office with the Doctor, the Brigade Leader and Section Leader Shaw listening to a BBC radio news report voiced by Jon Pertwee, who imitates the style of William Joyce, the scene was cut before transmission because Pertwee's voice was too identifiable. The radio announcer names the area where the Inferno project is taking place as Eastchester; the name is not mentioned anywhere else in the story, but is subsequently mentioned in spin-off media. The scene was included as an extra on the DVD releases, with the episode itself presented exactly as originally transmitted (using the b/w film recording for reference when editing).

References

External links

Inferno DVD page on the Doctor Who Restoration Team Website
Doctor Who Locations – Inferno

Reviews
Inferno reviews at Outpost Gallifrey

Target novelisation

Third Doctor serials
Doctor Who serials novelised by Terrance Dicks
1970 British television episodes
Alternate history television episodes
Television episodes about parallel universes
Dystopian television episodes